Interplanetary Monitoring Platform was a program managed by the NASA Goddard Space Flight Center in Greenbelt, Maryland, as part of the Explorers program, with the primary objectives of investigation of interplanetary plasma and the interplanetary magnetic field. The orbiting of IMP satellites in a variety of interplanetary and earth orbits allowed study of spatial and temporal relationships of geophysical and interplanetary phenomena simultaneously by several other NASA satellites.

Satellites

Technology
The IMP program was the first space program to use integrated circuit (IC) chips, which it first launched into space with the IMP-A (Explorer 18) in 1963. This predates the use of IC chips in the Apollo Guidance Computer, used for the Apollo program.

The MOSFET (metal–oxide–semiconductor field-effect transistor, or MOS transistor) was adopted by NASA for the IMP program in 1964. The use of MOSFETs was a major step forward in spacecraft electronics design.

The IMP-D (Explorer 33), launched in 1966, was the first spacecraft to use the MOSFET, which had been first demonstrated in 1960 and publicly revealed in 1963. MOS technology's simplicity of semiconductor device fabrication and manufacturing enabled higher transistor counts on integrated circuit chips. This resolved a growing problem facing spacecraft designers at the time, the need for greater on-board electronic capability for telecommunications and other functions. The Goddard Space Flight Center used MOSFETs in building block circuits, with MOSFET blocks and resistors accounting for 93% of the IMP-D's electronics. MOS technology greatly increased the number of on-board transistors and communication channels, from 1,200 transistors and 175 channels on the first three IMP spacecraft up to 2,000 transistors and 256 channels on the IMP-D. MOS technology also greatly reduced the number of electrical parts required on a spaceship, from 3,000 non-resistor parts on the IMP-A (Explorer 18) down to 1,000 non-resistor parts on the IMP-D, despite the IMP-D having twice the electrical complexity of the IMP-A. The MOSFET blocks were manufactured by General Microelectronics, which had NASA as its first MOS contract shortly after it had commercialized MOS technology in 1964.

Applications
IMPs were used to study the magnetic fields, solar wind and cosmic rays outside the magnetic field of the Earth. It was closely related to the development of the Apollo program. The IMP program consisted of a network of eleven satellites designed to collect data on space radiation in support of the Apollo program. The IMP satellites investigated plasma (ionized gas), cosmic rays, and magnetic fields in interplanetary and cislunar space, from various solar and terrestrial orbits. Data gathered by IMP spacecraft and satellites were used to support the Apollo program, enabling the first manned Moon landing with the Apollo 11 mission in 1969.

References

External links
 IMP (Interplanetary Monitoring Platform). David Darling

 
Explorers Program